McCurdy Mountain is a mountain summit in the Tarryall Mountains range of the Rocky Mountains of North America. Like its neighbor, Bison Peak, McCurdy Mountain features a variety of unusual granite formations.

Mountain

See also

List of Colorado mountain ranges
List of Colorado mountain summits
List of Colorado fourteeners
List of Colorado 4000 meter prominent summits
List of the most prominent summits of Colorado
List of Colorado county high points

References

External links

Mountains of Colorado
Mountains of Park County, Colorado
Pike National Forest
North American 3000 m summits